Norm Schmidt (born January 24, 1963) is a Canadian former professional ice hockey defenceman who played 125 games in the National Hockey League for the Pittsburgh Penguins between 1983 and 1987.

Schmidt was born in Sault Ste. Marie, Ontario. As a youth, he played in the 1976 Quebec International Pee-Wee Hockey Tournament with a minor ice hockey team from Sault Ste. Marie.

Career statistics

Regular season and playoffs

References

External links

1963 births
Living people
Baltimore Skipjacks players
Canadian ice hockey defencemen
Ice hockey people from Ontario
Oshawa Generals players
Pittsburgh Penguins draft picks
Pittsburgh Penguins players
Sault Ste. Marie Greyhounds players
Sportspeople from Sault Ste. Marie, Ontario